Lucas Martínez may refer to:
Lucas Martínez (field hockey) (born 1993), Argentine field hockey player
Lucas Martínez Quarta (born 1996), Argentine footballer
Lucas Martínez Lara, (1946–2016), Mexican Roman Catholic bishop
Lucas Martínez (footballer, born 1997), Chilean footballer
Lucas Martínez (footballer, born 1998), Uruguayan footballer